The arrondissement of Antony is an arrondissement of France in the Hauts-de-Seine department in the Île-de-France region. It has 11 communes.

Composition 

The communes of the arrondissement of Antony, and their INSEE codes, are:

 Antony (92002)
 Bagneux (92007)
 Bourg-la-Reine (92014)
 Châtenay-Malabry (92019)
 Châtillon (92020)
 Clamart (92023)
 Fontenay-aux-Roses (92032)
 Malakoff (92046)
 Montrouge (92049)
 Le Plessis-Robinson (92060)
 Sceaux (92071)

History

The arrondissement of Antony was created in 1966 as part of the department Seine. In 1968 it became part of the new department Hauts-de-Seine. At the January 2017 reorganisation of the arrondissements of Hauts-de-Seine, it lost one commune to the arrondissement of Boulogne-Billancourt.

As a result of the reorganisation of the cantons of France which came into effect in 2015, the borders of the cantons are no longer related to the borders of the arrondissements. The cantons of the arrondissement of Antony were, as of January 2015:

 Antony
 Bagneux
 Bourg-la-Reine
 Châtenay-Malabry
 Châtillon
 Clamart
 Fontenay-aux-Roses
 Malakoff
 Montrouge
 Le Plessis-Robinson
 Sceaux
 Vanves

Sub-prefects 
 Gérard Bougrier : 1993 - 8 February 1996 : sub-prefect of Antony

References

Antony